Lloyd Brown may refer to:

 Lloyd Brown (baseball) (1904–1974), baseball pitcher, manager and scout
 Lloyd Brown (veteran) (1901–2007), one of the last surviving American World War I veterans and last member of the US Navy to have signed up before the German armistice
 Lloyd L. Brown (1913–2003), American labor organizer, Communist Party activist and writer
 Lloyd Brown (cricketer) (born 1995), South African cricketer
 Lloyd D. Brown (1892–1950), U.S. Army officer
 Lloyd O. Brown (1928–1993), lawyer and judge from Ohio
 Lloyd Brown (New Zealand lawyer) QC (1926–1988), represented Air New Zealand in the Mount Erebus inquiry